Bogor LavAni is a men's volleyball team based at LavAni Sports Center, Gunung Putri, Bogor Regency, West Java, Indonesia. Bogor LavAni was founded by the former 6th President of Indonesia, Susilo Bambang Yudhoyono. This team competes in Proliga which is the highest division in volleyball competition in Indonesia. The team had their inaugural season of competition in 2022 and won the Proliga title for the first time after defeating Surabaya Bhayangkara Samator in the final round.

Etymology
Bogor LavAni comes from three words, namely "Bogor" which is the place where this team was founded and "Lav" comes from English namely "Love" while "Ani" is the name of a his late wife, Ani Yudhoyono.

History
Bogor LavAni was founded by Susilo Bambang Yudhoyono on December 1, 2019, in Gunung Putri, Bogor Regency. His motivation for forming this club was love and respect for his late wife Ani Yudhoyono. This team has been preparing to appear in the highest caste of the Indonesian Volleyball League since 2020 but was stopped by the Covid-19 pandemic and then only realized in Proliga on 2022.

Players

Seasons

Honours

Domestic

League
Proliga
 Champion (1): 2022

References

External links

Bogor Regency
2019 establishments in Indonesia
Indonesian volleyball clubs
Volleyball clubs established in 2019